Dennis Earl Gaubatz (born February 11, 1940) is a former American football player who played linebacker in the National Football League (NFL) for the Detroit Lions and the Baltimore Colts. 

Gaubatz played college football at Louisiana State University and was selected in the eighth round (111th overall) of the 1963 NFL Draft by the Lions. He was traded to the Colts for running back Joe Don Looney and an undisclosed draft choice on June 3, 1965.

He intercepted ten passes and recovered six fumbles in his seven-year NFL career, and was part of the Colts' 1968 NFL Championship team.

Gaubatz was on the cover of Sports Illustrated in November 1965.

References

External links
 

1940 births
Living people
American football linebackers
LSU Tigers football players
Detroit Lions players
Baltimore Colts players